The Challenge is a 1982 American action film directed by John Frankenheimer and written by John Sayles, Richard Maxwell, and Marc Norman. The film stars Scott Glenn and Toshirō Mifune, and features several aikido-based action scenes choreographed by Steven Seagal, prior to the start of his own film career.

Plot 
A katana, one of a pair known as "The Equals", was an heirloom of the Yoshida family, passed down through the generations before being lost during World War II. It was finally tracked down and recovered in California by Toshio and Akiko. Hoping to return its rightful owner, their father Toru, Toshio hires down-on-his luck prize fighter Rick Murphy to smuggle the sword back to Japan.

Upon their arrival, Murphy and Toshio are captured by Hideo's thugs.  Murphy learns that the sword is a fake and himself a decoy, intended to ward off potential thieves. Toshio is murdered and Murphy is faced with the prospect of being killed by Toru's brother, a well-connected kuromaku (or "black curtain" in English, a fixer who works behind the scenes for Yakuza) named Hideo. Murphy escapes Hideo's thugs and is rescued by Akiko before he is murdered.  Murphy awakens in Akiko's family home and after a brief stay departs with his money.  Hideo's thugs find Murphy and instead of murdering him they advise him to infiltrate Yoshida's martial arts school and obtain the sword. He does so, yet finds himself being drawn into the ways of Japanese etiquette and tradition to the point where he returns the sword to Toru himself after having the perfect opportunity to escape with it. Murphy then humbly asks Toru if he can be forgiven and taken back in because he wants to learn the ways of Bushido. Toru agrees, but only if Murphy follows Toru's conditions.

Murphy continues to bumble his way through life at Toru's school until, after a treacherous and almost fatal attempt by one of the higher members of the school to steal the sword, he leaves and is found in a hotel in Kyoto by Akiko, Toru's only daughter. Finding romance, they go out to see the sights and sounds of the city, including watching a Shinto ceremony. During the hub-bub of the crowded parade, Murphy and Akiko get separated and Hideo's henchmen kidnap her and deliver her to her uncle. Toru, laden with ancient weaponry, ventures out to Hideo's industrial complex where he is shot and wounded by Hideo's bodyguard Ando. Ando is slain by Hideo for this, and Murphy – who has joined him in his quest – opts to fight Hideo to defend his sensei. Murphy manages to kill Hideo and present "The Equals" to Toru.

Cast 
 Scott Glenn as Rick Murphy
 Toshiro Mifune as Satoru "Toru" Yoshida
 Atsuo Nakamura as Hideo Yoshida
 Donna Kei Benz as Akiko Yoshida
 Calvin Jung as Ando
 Clyde Kusatsu as Go
 Sab Shimono as Toshio Yoshida
 Ryuji Yamashita as young Toshio
 Kiyoaki Nagai as Kubo
 Kenta Fukasaku as Jiro
 Shōgo Shimada as Shin'ichi Yoshida
 Yoshio Inaba as Kenzo the Instructor
 Seiji Miyaguchi as Old Man
 Miiko Taka as Machiko Yoshida

Production 
The film was shot entirely in Japan. The Kyoto International Conference Center was used as the location of Hideo's headquarters.

Alternate version 
A re-edited version of the film entitled Sword of the Ninja was created for television. In this version, about ten minutes of footage are cut, some of the graphic violence of the original version is removed, and "fades" are added to make room for commercial breaks.

Reception 
Critic Dennis Schwartz gave the film a C+ grade, calling it a "pointless", "low-level Chuck Norris flick". He enjoyed Frankenheimer's directing and Mifune's performance, questioning why they chose to make such a film. Time Out wrote that the "elaborate combat will please fans", but that The Yakuza was a much better film in the genre. Janet Maslin for The New York Times was unimpressed with the film's "regrettably vicious streak" and wrote that the film had unused potential. However, she praised Toshirō Mifune's performance as adding weight to the film. Adam Lippe, writing for Examiner.com, had a better opinion of the film, calling it "grimy, off-putting, and just right for the moment."

On Rotten Tomatoes, The Challenge holds a rating of 50% from 16 reviews.

References

External links 
 
 
 

1982 action films
1982 films
American action films
1980s English-language films
Films directed by John Frankenheimer
Films shot in Los Angeles
Films shot in Kyoto Prefecture
Films set in Kyoto
Films set in 1945
Films set in 1982
1980s Japanese-language films
Films scored by Jerry Goldsmith
CBS Theatrical Films films
Films with screenplays by John Sayles
Embassy Pictures films
Japan in non-Japanese culture
Yakuza films
1980s American films
1980s Japanese films